Kirk Hanefeld (born May 24, 1956) is an American professional golfer.  

Hanefeld was born in Claremont, New Hampshire. He played collegiately at the University of Houston. He is currently an active member of the Champions Tour, and has previously been a prominent name in the New England section of the PGA.

Amateur wins
1971 New Hampshire Junior, Red Ryan CYO Junior
1972 New Hampshire Junior, Red Ryan CYO Junior
1973 New Hampshire Junior,  Red Ryan CYO Intermediate, New Hampshire School Boy Championship, New England Junior
1974 New Hampshire Amateur
1976 New Hampshire Amateur
1977 New England Amateur

Professional wins
this list may be incomplete
1982 New Hampshire Open
1998 Rhode Island Open
2000 New England PGA Championship
2001 New England PGA Championship
2003 New England PGA Championship, Maine Open
2005 Maine Open, Rhode Island Open
2008 Senior PGA Professional National Championship
2011 Senior PGA Professional National Championship

References

External links

American male golfers
Houston Cougars men's golfers
PGA Tour Champions golfers
Golfers from New Hampshire
Golfers from Massachusetts
People from Claremont, New Hampshire
People from Acton, Massachusetts
Sportspeople from Middlesex County, Massachusetts
1956 births
Living people